The 2020 NRL season was the 113th season of professional rugby league in Australia and the 23rd season run by the National Rugby League.

Teams

The lineup of teams remained unchanged for the 14th consecutive year.

 Notes

Pre-season

The pre-season featured a returning Nines competition held at HBF Park in Perth on 14 & 15 February, replacing the competition previously held in Auckland. The All Stars match was played on 22 February at Cbus Super Stadium, returning to the contest's original venue. The 2020 World Club Challenge saw the NRL premiers Sydney Roosters defeat the Super League champions St. Helens, making them the first club to win consecutive World Club Challenges.

Regular season

The NRL had announced that the Grand Final would be hosted at the Sydney Cricket Ground while the main venue for the decider, ANZ Stadium, underwent an $810m redevelopment. This would have been the first Grand Final to be played at the SCG since 1987. The redevelopment was however scrapped due to the COVID-19 pandemic, meaning that the Grand Final would be again played at ANZ Stadium.

State of Origin was played in Adelaide for the first time, with Game 1 of the 2020 series played at Adelaide Oval.

Impact of the COVID-19 pandemic

The 2020 season was disrupted by the COVID-19 pandemic, which was formally declared a pandemic by the World Health Organization on 11 March 2020, one day prior to the scheduled start of the premiership season. Restrictions imposed by the different state governments related to social distancing, lockdowns of non-essential services which lasted for three months across the country, and border controls for interstate and international travel, all had significant effects on the completion of the 2020 season.

Fixture
Prior to the recommencement of the season, the NRL announced the fixture would be shortened from 24 matches per team to 20 (including the two rounds already played prior to the season suspension), which each team playing each other once, and an additional five teams for a second time. The season had commenced on 12 March as originally scheduled; but as restrictions, followed for periods of formal quarantine, were introduced on interstate travel, the season was suspended after round two.

The round two match between the Sydney Roosters and Manly-Warringah Sea Eagles, which was originally meant to be played at Central Coast Stadium, was shifted to Leichhardt Oval.

The new draw was released on 21 May, with just six venues used between Rounds 3 to 7. The Warriors moved to Gosford to play at Central Coast Stadium, the Titans played home games at Suncorp Stadium with the Broncos, and the NSW teams and Canberra were divided between Bankwest Stadium, Campbelltown Stadium, and Central Coast Stadium in a way that no stadium hosts more than one match in a day. The Cowboys and Storm continued to host games at their normal home grounds, Queensland Country Bank Stadium and AAMI Park respectively. From round eight, all teams bar the Storm and Warriors were permitted to return to their home grounds; in the Storm's case, a second wave of COVID-19 cases in Victoria forced the team to evacuate the state and set up camp on the Sunshine Coast, the home of their netball sister side the Sunshine Coast Lightning, for an indefinite period.

Opening round
The first round of play continued almost unimpeded, although crowd numbers were impacted by fears surrounding the virus.

International restrictions on travel made in New Zealand, whereby all arrivals would be required to self-isolate for two weeks, resulted in the New Zealand Warriors temporarily setting up base in Kingscliff, New South Wales, having already come to Australia to play their Round 1 match. Their Round 2 game against Canberra was played at Cbus Super Stadium on the Gold Coast, instead of at the Warriors' home ground in Auckland.

Crowds
Government restrictions on gatherings meant that, starting in Round 2, crowds were locked out of senior NRL matches for the first time in the code's history. State governments gradually allowed crowds, often small and restricted in size, into games, starting immediately from Round 5 in New South Wales, and from Round 6 in Queensland.

Season suspension
During Round 2, speculation that the season would be suspended, if not cancelled, grew. Circumstances surrounding the virus were evolving at a rapid rate, and the future beyond Round 2 was unknown. Many ideas to ensure the season could continue, including moving all players and matches to a single location in Central Queensland where they could continue to play in self-isolation.

On 23 March, the NRL suspended the season indefinitely for the first time in the competition's history, in response to tightening government restrictions to slow the spread of COVID-19. In the following weeks, matches that were scheduled to be played at regional venues were cancelled, as was the Magic Round.

Season resumption
On 9 April, the NRL announced its intentions to restart the competition on 28 May, with most details still to be determined. The decision was one of three recommendations to come out of Project Apollo, which was created by the NRL's innovations committee to analyse potential solutions to restart the season. The other recommendations included ensuring that a full State of Origin series be played, and keeping with a one-match grand final. However, the NRL required Federal and State governments, as well as broadcasters Fox and Nine, on board with the plan. The structure of the restarted season would also largely depend on what government restrictions were in place by the end of May.

By 22 April, the NRL had obtained government approval to restart the season on 28 May. On 28 April 2020, the NRL announced that the competition would be a 20-round competition, which would allow each team to play each other once with 5 extra fixtures. Points earned in the first two rounds were still counted. State of Origin was played in November after the season's conclusion, while the Grand Final was played on 25 October at ANZ Stadium.

During late April and early May, general government restrictions began to ease in Australia due to successful efforts to slow the spread of COVID-19. The Queensland State Government allowed the three Queensland-based sides to train and play at home; this meant they did not have to base themselves in New South Wales. The Melbourne Storm were forced to move to Albury in NSW to begin their training, with Victoria's government waiting longer to begin easing restrictions, but were able to return to AAMI Park the following week. On 2 May, the New Zealand Warriors were permitted by both Federal governments to enter Australia the following day. They entered two weeks of self-isolation in the regional city of Tamworth, where they were permitted to train to avoid any unfair disadvantage. International travel restrictions meant the side had to remain in Australia for an indefinite period of time, however talks of a Trans-Tasman 'bubble', in which travel between Australia and New Zealand would be exclusively permitted, left the possibility open for the Warriors to return to New Zealand and play home matches there later in the season; however, this did not eventuate.

Despite the border between New South Wales and Queensland remaining closed to the public for most of the season, all NRL teams were exempt from the travel ban for the purpose of playing matches, with the New South Wales-based teams plus the Canberra Raiders and New Zealand Warriors travelling to and from Queensland on game day instead of staying overnight, and the three Queensland-based clubs plus the Melbourne Storm making the same trip in reverse (that is, travelling to and from Sydney or Canberra on game day).

In late June, the Melbourne Storm were forced to relocate away from Victoria after a sharp increase in coronavirus cases in the state. Their round seven match against the New Zealand Warriors was played at Netstrata Jubilee Stadium in Sydney; the match was notable as following the game Cameron Smith, Craig Bellamy and Ryan Hoffman all went into the Warriors' rooms to thank and acknowledge the sacrifices they made by moving to Australia during the COVID pandemic. Following that, the Storm relocated to the Sunshine Coast, Queensland, where they played their remaining home games out of Suncorp Stadium and Sunshine Coast Stadium, as well as finals at the former venue. By the time the Storm won the Premiership, they had been away from their home in Victoria for four months.

Club medical restrictions
During the pandemic, the NRL brought in strict new biosecurity measures to protect those in the game, including a code-wide request that players be vaccinated against the common flu, as "any player that has any respiratory illness... potentially will take the whole team out." The NSW Government did not enforce the compulsory vaccination agreement, whereas the Queensland Government stood by the vaccination measures previously agreed to by the NRL that 100% of players would be flu-vaccinated prior to the competition restarting. Only players who had been vaccinated, or had genuine medical grounds exempting them, were permitted to play or train in Queensland.

Rule changes
It was announced that the remainder of the games would be played with just one referee. The referees threatened to strike as a result of this. However, an agreement was reached on 22 May for the one-ref system to be used.

Results

Bold – Home game
X – Bye
* – Golden point game
Opponent for round listed above margin

Ladder

Ladder progression

Numbers highlighted in green indicate that the team finished the round inside the top 8.
Numbers highlighted in blue indicates the team finished first on the ladder in that round.
Numbers highlighted in red indicates the team finished last place on the ladder in that round.
Underlined numbers indicate that the team had a bye during that round.

Finals series

Chart

Grand Final

Player statistics and records

The following statistics are as of the conclusion of Round 20.

Top 5 point scorers

Top 5 try scorers

Top 5 goal scorers

Top 5 tacklers

2020 Transfers

Players
Source:

Loan moves

Coaches

Notes

References

 
NRL